Bethel High School is a public secondary school located in the town of Bethel, Fairfield County, Connecticut, approximately  north of New York City.  The school serves the town of Bethel.

Extracurricular activities

Athletics
Winter sports:
Ice hockey

 The BBD Ice Cats Hockey team, with members from Brookfield, Bethel & Danbury high schools, is a "tri-op" high school hockey team competing in the South West Conference (SWC) - D2/3.  They are based at the Danbury (CT) Ice Arena. In 2009–10 and 2012–13 BBD won the Div.2/Div.3 SWC Championship and were runners-up in 2011.  They advanced to the CIAC Div.3 State Final in 2009–10.  In the 2012–13 season BBD moved up to Div.2 and advanced to the state semi-final.

Other extracurricular activities
Bethel High School is home to an award-winning Junior Reserve Officers' Training Corps (NJROTC) unit.
Bethel High School's Mock Trial Team won the Connecticut State Championship in 2008.
Bethel High School is home to the multi-award-winning Marching Wildcats. The Marching Wildcats are USBANDS States and Nationals winners.
Bethel High School is home to a Connecticut State Championship level Overwatch (video game) team.

Notable alumni 

 Raghib Allie-Brennan, member of the Connecticut House of Representatives
 Matt Barnes, professional baseball player, pitcher for the Boston Red Sox
 Dan Cramer, mixed martial artist, former UFC Fighter
 Seth Grahame-Smith, screenwriter, producer and author
 Thurston Moore, co-founder of Sonic Youth
 Meg Ryan, actress
 Peter Selgin, author
 Greg Sutton, soccer player

References

External links 
 

Buildings and structures in Bethel, Connecticut
Educational institutions established in 1939
Schools in Fairfield County, Connecticut
Public high schools in Connecticut
1939 establishments in Connecticut